Daredevil Drivers is a 1938 American crime film directed by B. Reeves Eason and written by Sherman L. Lowe. The film stars Beverly Roberts, Dick Purcell, Gloria Blondell, Gordon Oliver, Charley Foy and Donald Briggs. The film was released by Warner Bros. on February 12, 1938.

Synopsis
Automobile racer Bill Foster is disqualified from a race for reckless driving, then banned from competing in the sport altogether. On the road, he then collides with a bus, owned by a company run by Jerry Neeley, a woman trying to stay in business against an aggressive rival.

Foster ends up working for Jerry's competition. A lawsuit goes against her that puts her livelihood in jeopardy. When a bus goes out of control, endangering passengers including children, Foster is able to stop it and save everyone just in time. He then joins forces with Jerry to save her company.

Cast 
Beverly Roberts as Jerry Neeley
Dick Purcell as Bill Foster
Gloria Blondell as Lucy Mack
Gordon Oliver as Mark Banning
 Charley Foy as 'Stub' Wilson
Donald Briggs as Tommy Burnell
Eric Stanley as Mr. Lane
Max Hoffman Jr. as Joe Bailey
Ferris Taylor as Councilman Baker
Cliff Clark as Mr. McAullife
Earl Dwire as Mr. Perkins
William Hopper as Neeley Bus Driver
Fred Lawrence as Burnell Bus Driver
Anderson Lawler as Mr. Bounty 
John Harron as Mr. Chet Maxfield

References

External links 
 

1938 films
Warner Bros. films
American auto racing films
American crime films
1938 crime films
Films directed by B. Reeves Eason
American black-and-white films
1930s English-language films
1930s American films